West Green is a station on the Green Line of the RTA Rapid Transit in Shaker Heights, Ohio.

The station is designed to provide convenient boarding for riders who park in the western end of the parking area.

History
The extension was originally single-track. A second track was added to the extension in 1942 when increased ridership during World War II made single-track operation no longer feasible.

In 1980 and 1981, the Green and Blue Lines were completely renovated with new track, ballast, poles and wiring, and new stations were built along the line. The renovated line along Shaker Boulevard opened on October 11, 1980.

Station layout
The station consists of two side platforms with two small shelters on the westbound platform. There is no entrance to the station other than through the parking area that it shares with Green Road station.

Notable places nearby
 Laurel School
 Beachwood High School

References

External links

Green Line (RTA Rapid Transit)
Railway stations in the United States opened in 1936
1936 establishments in Ohio